The Mayor of the Metropolitan Borough of Wigan is the first citizen, Chairperson of the Wigan Council and elected representative of the Wigan Borough and the Council.

Duties of the mayor and its origins
The mayoralty of Wigan goes back to its first creation in 1246 AD, when Henry III granted the town its first royal charter; however, since 1974 the office of the mayor has been created by legislative statute of the Constitution of Wigan Council (Article 5, Section 1). The Mayor of Wigan as the 'First Citizen' has highest precedence unless a member of the royal family is present. As the elected representative of the borough, the mayor acts as focal point for the community as well as promoting the borough and forging national and international links, which includes continuing links with the Mayor of Angers in Western France as the twinned city. The official position of the mayor and the council includes presiding over the meetings of the council, of which, if the mayor is unable to preside at the time, it is the duty of the elected deputy mayor to temporarily take his place. Wigan Town Hall in the centre of Wigan serves as the official location where the office of the mayor is located and also serves as the location for meetings of the council in the main chamber. The Town Hall of Leigh is often used by the mayor and other councillors as a second headquarters.

The position of the Mayor is politically neutral and so even though the Mayor remains Chairman of the Council, the Council assembly elects itself a Leader of the Council who will also chair the Wigan Cabinet. The Office of the Mayor is located in the Wigan Town Hall were the Council Chamber is also located.

When in office, other duties include receiving members of the Royal Family and other state visitors, attending ceremonies and engagements of charities as representative that take place within or out of the borough. The Mayor also leads the service on Remembrance Sunday at the cenotaph of Wigan Town Centre in November.

The longest continuously serving Mayor of Wigan was Stephen Dawber, who served two consecutive terms as Mayor from May 2019 to May 2021, due to the inability of Councillors to meet to select a new Mayor in 2020 due to the COVID-19 Pandemic.

Current mayor

The 49th and current Mayor is Councillor Marie Morgan, who was elected by the council general assembly and officially inaugurated on 26 May 2022. She succeeded Councillor Yvonne Klieve, who served from 26 May 2021 to 26 May 2022. Mayor Morgan's consort is her husband and follow Councillor, Clive Morgan, Councillor for Winstanley.

Succession, deputy mayor, mayoress and consort
The Deputy Mayor of Wigan is elected by the council assembly as second citizen who assists the elected Mayor and their consort in their duties. The deputy mayor is also first in succession to the mayoralty. The current deputy mayor is Councillor Michael McLoughlin.

Traditionally if the incumbent is a gentleman, the wife of the Mayor would take the title of Mayoress of Wigan. However, when a female Mayor is elected, her husband would assume the role of Mayor's Consort.

Charity appeal

Traditionally the Mayor of Wigan can choose one or more charities to support throughout their year in office.

Style and title

The Mayor of Wigan is entitled to the style of "The Worshipful" however the style is only used when referring to the office rather than the holder and is not retained after they have left office. The Mayor is referred to in speech as "Mr. Mayor" and if a female councillor is in office they are referred to as "Madam Mayor".

The full title of the current Mayor is: The Worshipful The Mayor of Wigan Council, Councillor Marie Morgan

List of mayors of Wigan
(note: * = deceased)

References

 http://democracy.wigan.gov.uk/documents/s1266/2.5%20Article%205%20-%20Chairing%20the%20Council.pdf

 https://web.archive.org/web/20120505064643/http://www.wigan.gov.uk/Services/CouncilDemocracy/Mayoralty
 http://www.wigan.gov.uk/NR/rdonlyres/66534D13-E181-4BF6-BFF3-F05FC46600DC/0/Mayorcharitryleaflet.pdf 

Metropolitan Borough of Wigan
Wigan
 
Greater Manchester-related lists